{|
{{Infobox ship image
| Ship image=SS_Cape_Island_MSC.jpg
| Ship caption=, Cape Intrepids sister ship, sailing into harbor
}}

|}SS Cape Intrepid was originally laid down in 1975 as SS Arizona a Type C7 ship intended for both commercial or military use. The ship was launched in 1975 and turned over to the Maritime Administration for commercial use and acquired by the Lykes Brothers and named the SS Lipscomb Lykes. On June 8th 1976 she was removed from commercial duty and reacquired by the United States Navy and renamed USNS Jupiter''' to serve alongside . On 8 June 1976 she was transferred to Military Sealift Command, and renamed the SS Cape Intrepid''. Since then the ship has been active in transport roles including a long term attachment to the 833rd transport regiment. She is currently in reserve status and can be activated if called upon in 5 days as part of the ready reserve fleet. The ship is currently moored in Tacoma, Washington.

References
 (http://www.msc.navy.mil/inventory/ships.asp?ship=39 Ship's official page on Military Sealift Command)
 (http://www.navsource.org/archives/09/54/540011.htm Ship photo index) NavSource Online: Service Ship Photo Archive
 (http://wikimapia.org/8006188/SS-Cape-Island-AKR-10-SS-Cape-Intrepid-AKR-11 Wikimapia site)
 (http://www.msc.navy.mil/sealift/2003/february/loadwashington.htm Article about assignment the ship was given)

 http://www.komonews.com/news/local/US-military-ship-under-tow-after-losing-power-near-Clallam-Bay-299452961.html

Ships built in Bath, Maine
1976 ships